Ousmane Ndong (born 20 September 1999) is a Senegalese professional footballer who plays as a centre-back for Albion.

Career
Ndong started out as a central midfielder, spending his early youth years in Senegal with Angelo Africa, Teungueth FC and Cayor Foot FC. In 2018, Ndong moved to Argentina to join Primera División team Lanús. He played in their academy for two years, latterly as captain, whilst transforming into a centre-back. He made the breakthrough into Luis Zubeldía's first-team in mid-2020. He scored in a friendly against Arsenal de Sarandí on 29 September, before making his senior debut in the Copa de la Liga Profesional against Newell's Old Boys on 14 November; becoming the first Senegalese player to play in the Argentine top-flight. On 3 January 2022 it was confirmed, that Ndong's contract with Lanús had been terminated.

At the end of February 2022, Ndong moved to Uruguayan Primera División side Albion.

Personal life
Born in Dakar, Ndong was born with two brothers and one sister. His father is a retired policeman, while his mother (d. 2019) was a doctor. He was childhood friends with Sadio Mané. In 2019, in Argentina, Ndong was robbed at gunpoint. He also suffered racist abuse while in the South American country. It took him nine months to learn Spanish, having only previously spoken French and partial English. Ndong states his love of Argentina came from watching Lionel Messi and the Argentina national team; revealing he cried when the nation was eliminated from the Copa América Centenario.

Career statistics
.

Notes

References

External links

1999 births
Living people
Senegalese footballers
Senegalese expatriate footballers
Footballers from Dakar
Association football defenders
Club Atlético Lanús footballers
Albion F.C. players
Argentine Primera División players
Uruguayan Primera División players
Expatriate footballers in Argentina
Expatriate footballers in Uruguay
Senegalese expatriate sportspeople in Argentina
Senegalese expatriate sportspeople in Uruguay